Çok Güzel Hareketler Bunlar (literally "These Are Very Beautiful Movements" but would be translated "Nice Moves" in the American vernacular)

It is theatrical comedy, which awarded at 36th Golden Butterfly Best Comedy Award. It was premiered on 14 February 2006 on BKM Theatre and continued until the end of 2012 in Europe and Turkey. First episode released on 7 May 2008 in Kanal D and continued to release until 26 June 2011. 2012 New Year Special Episode released on Star TV.

In Yilmaz Erdogan's management, BKM Mutfak actors takes the stage and wrote sketch. All cast is both screenwriter and actor. They give an active role to the audience, they let audience to rate the sketch.

In 2010,  "Çok Filim Hareketler Bunlar" the movie titled , which was written and played by BKM actors. Also, BKM actors played numerous commercials for Vodafone, Nescafé, Teknosa, Sony, Peyman, Lipton.

Also, A education series, titled "Yılmaz Erdoğan ile Öğrence" was released in TRT 2 which a state art canal. It is about script, cinema, stage.

In 2017, a sequel premiered under the title Çok Güzel Hareketler 2.

BKM made different concept theatrical comedies with different actor team in Arkadaşım Hoşgeldin, Bir Demet Tiyatro, Güldür Güldür Show and Güldür Güldür Show Çocuk. Yilmaz Erdogan's brother Deniz Erdogan wrote lyrics for a very familiar American folk song "Camptown Races" and that production became the generic music of the program.

Topic

The Actors play the sketches that they've written and at the end of the episode, Yılmaz Erdoğan comes out and wants from the spectators to evaluate the performances of the actors and the spectators grade them. They grade the players with Very Good Movement ( Çok Güzel Hareket-THE BEST), Good Movement (Güzel Hareket), Bell (Zil) and Awful (Rezil).

Series overview

Cast and crew

Cast
Ayça Erturan
Aydan Taş
Ayşegül Akdemir
Burcu Gönder
Bülent Emrah Parlak
Büşra Pekin
Emre Canpolat
Ersin Korkut
Eser Yenenler
Gizem Tuğral
Gülhan Tekin
Gülsüm Alkan
Hamdi Kahraman
İbrahim Büyükak
Metin Keçeci
Metin Yıldız
Murat Eken
Nazmı Kahraman
Neşe Sayles
Oğuzhan Koç
Pelin Öztekin
Şahin Irmak
Şevket Süha Tezel
Zeynep Koçak

Training Staff
Yılmaz Erdoğan
Demet Akbağ
Tolga Çevik
Zerrin Sümer
Altan Erkekli
Bahtiyar Engin
Sinan Bengier

References

Turkish comedy television series
2008 Turkish television series debuts
Kanal D original programming
Television shows set in Istanbul
Television series produced in Istanbul
Turkish television series endings